John Strange may refer to:

John Strange (MP) for Suffolk (UK Parliament constituency) and Norfolk (UK Parliament constituency)
John Strange (Canadian politician) (1788–1840), Scottish-born Canadian merchant and politician
John Strange (Wisconsin politician) (1852–1923), former Lieutenant Governor of Wisconsin
Sir John Strange (English politician) (1696–1754), English barrister, politician and master of the rolls
John Strange (diplomat) (1732–1799), son of the above; natural philosopher and diplomat
Johnny Strange, sideshow and freak show performance artist
Johnny Strange (adventurer) (1991–2015)

See also
Jonathan Strange & Mr Norrell, novel